Hakuyū Taizan Maezumi ( Maezumi Hakuyū, February 24, 1931 – May 15, 1995) was a Japanese Zen Buddhist teacher and rōshi, and lineage holder in the Sōtō, Rinzai, and Sanbo Kyodan traditions of Zen. He combined the Rinzai use of kōans and the Sōtō emphasis on shikantaza in his teachings, influenced by his years studying under Hakuun Yasutani in Sanbo Kyodan. He founded or co-founded several institutions and practice centers, including the Zen Center of Los Angeles, White Plum Asanga, Yokoji Zen Mountain Center and the Zen Mountain Monastery.

Taizan Maezumi left behind twelve dharma successors, appointed sixty-eight priests and gave Buddhist precepts to more than five hundred practitioners. Along with Zen teachers like Shunryū Suzuki, Seungsahn, Joshu Sasaki and Hsuan Hua, Maezumi greatly influenced the American Zen landscape. Several Dharma Successors of his—including Tetsugen Bernard Glassman, Dennis Merzel, John Daido Loori, Jan Chozen Bays, Gerry Shishin Wick, Joko Beck, and William Nyogen Yeo—have gone on to found Zen communities of their own.

Maezumi died unexpectedly while visiting Japan in 1995.

Biography

Maezumi was born in Japan on February 24, 1931, to Yoshiko Kuroda-Maezumi and Baian Hakujun Kuroda, a prominent Sōtō priest, in his father's temple in Ōtawara, Tochigi. In later years, he took the name Maezumi, his mother's maiden name. He was ordained as a novice monk in the Sōtō lineage at age eleven, and in high school began studying Zen under a lay Rinzai instructor, Koryū Osaka. While studying under Koryu he attended Komazawa University—receiving degrees in oriental literature and philosophy. After college he trained at Sōji-ji, and then received shihō from his father in 1955. In 1956 he was sent to the United States to serve as a priest at the Zenshuji in Little Tokyo, Los Angeles, a Japanese-American neighborhood. He worked part-time at a factory.

The Zenshuji Soto Mission consisted of a Japanese-American congregation that placed little emphasis on zazen. Maezumi began sitting zazen occasionally with Nyogen Senzaki, in nearby Boyle Heights, Los Angeles for the next two years. In 1959 Maezumi took classes in English at San Francisco State University.The same year he met Shunryū Suzuki for the first time and occasionally visited Suzuki's temple, Sokoji, for ceremonies. Early in the 1960s, Maezumi began holding zazen at Zenshuji for Western students, which eventually led to the opening of the Zen Center of Los Angeles in 1967. That same year he married his first wife, Charlene (they divorced in 1971.)

Also in 1967, Maezumi began studying with Hakuun Yasutani, completing kōan study under him and receiving inka (dharma transmission) in 1970. He also received inka from Koryū Osaka in 1973, making him a lineage-holder in the Sōtō, Rinzai and Sanbo Kyodan schools.

In 1975 Maezumi married his second wife, Martha Ekyo Maezumi, and later the couple had three children (his daughter Kyrie Maezumi is an actress). In 1976, Maezumi founded the non-profit Kuroda Institute for the Study of Buddhism and Human Values, promoting academic scholarship on Buddhist topics. The White Plum Asanga was also established during this period. His senior student Tetsugen Bernard Glassman opened the Zen Community of New York in 1979 with Maezumi's blessing and encouragement. Another student, John Daido Loori, acquired land in the Catskill Mountains of New York and in 1980 established Zen Mountain Monastery (ZMM) with Maezumi; Loori was installed as Abbot at ZMM in 1989. That following year Maezumi founded a summer retreat for the ZCLA called the Yokoji Zen Mountain Center, which today serves as a year-round residential and non-residential Zen training center. In 1984 another student, Dennis Merzel, left ZCLA to establish the Kanzeon Sangha, an international network practicing in the White Plum lineage.

Maezumi died on May 15, 1995, while visiting his family in Japan.  Not long before dying, he had given inka (dharma transmission) to Tetsugen Bernard Glassman. He did this to emphasize the Sanbo Kyodan connection of his past into the Dharma transmission of White Plum Asanga, naming Glassman President of the organization in his will.

Teaching style

Due to his training in three Japanese lineages, Maezumi employed both Rinzai kōan study and Sōtō shikantaza in his teaching curriculum—an approach developed by his teacher Hakuun Yasutani. He was known to be especially strict about the posture of his students while sitting zazen. Maezumi used a range of kōans from different Zen traditions, including the Blue Cliff Record, The Gateless Gate, Transmission of the Lamp, and the Book of Equanimity. According to author and Dharma Successor Gerry Shishin Wick, Maezumi was also fond of a particular saying—"appreciate your life." This also is the title of a compiled book of teachings by Maezumi, published by Shambhala Publications. In it Maezumi says, "I encourage you. Please enjoy this wonderful life together. Appreciate the world just this! There is nothing extra. Genuinely appreciate your life as the most precious treasure and take good care of it."

Criticism
Maezumi publicly admitted he was an alcoholic in 1983, and sought treatment at the Betty Ford Center. This coincided with revelations that he had been having sexual relationships with some of his female followers at the Zen Center of Los Angeles despite being married to his wife, Martha Ekyo Maezumi, "including one of the recipients of his dharma transmission". According to Kirsten Mitsuyo Maezumi, this "caused the separation of my parents and was the reason my mother left the Zen Center of Los Angeles with my brother and [me] in 1983".

Maezumi was forthcoming in admitting his mistakes and did not justify his behaviors. These events caused much turmoil in his school, and many students left as a result. Some members who stayed described themselves as forced to see Maezumi on a more human level, even seeing this period as a breakthrough for them, no longer deluded into thinking a teacher could be beyond imperfection. Both Bays and Tetsugen Bernard Glassman founded their own sanghas at this time. When remembering Maezumi, author David Chadwick had this to say: "I'd say he had an interesting mix of humility and arrogance. Mainly to me he'd seem arrogant at a distance, but close up he'd be right there with me not putting on any airs."

Influence

Maezumi named twelve Dharma Successors, ordained sixty-eight priests, and administered the Buddhist precepts to over five hundred individuals. Author James Ishmael Ford says, 

Jan Chozen Bays says, 

His daughter Kirsten Mitsuyo Maezumi writes:

Dharma heirs
Maezumi Roshi gave Dharma transmission to the following individuals:

 Tetsugen Bernard Glassman
 Dennis Merzel
 Joko Beck
 Jan Chozen Bays
 John Daido Loori
 Gerry Shishin Wick
 John Tesshin Sanderson
 Alfred Jitsudo Ancheta
 Charles Tenshin Fletcher
 Susan Myoyu Andersen
 Nicolee Jikyo McMahon
 William Nyogen Yeo

Bibliography
1976 On Zen Practice: Body, Breath, Mind by Maezumi and Tetsugen Bernard Glassman
1978 On Zen Practice II: Body, Breath, Mind (a.k.a. The Hazy Moon of Enlightenment) by Maezumi and Tetsugen Bernard Glassman
1978 Way of Everyday Life
1998 Echoless Valley
2001 Appreciate Your Life: Zen Teachings of Taizan Maezumi Roshi
2001 Teaching of the Great Mountain: Zen Talks by Taizan Maezumi edited by Anton Tenkei Coppens

See also
 Buddhism in the United States
 Buddhism in the West
List of Rinzai Buddhists
 Timeline of Zen Buddhism in the United States

References

Sources

External links
White Plum Asanga
Obituary
Je leven waarderen (Appreciating Your Life) TV documentary about Maezumi's life and work by the Dutch Buddhist Broadcasting Foundation. Netherlands/USA (2008) English w. Dutch subtitles, 60 min.

Japanese Buddhist clergy
Komazawa University alumni
Rinzai Buddhists
Sanbo Kyodan Buddhists
Soto Zen Buddhists
Zen Buddhism writers
Rōshi
1931 births
1995 deaths
Buddhism in the United States
White Plum Asanga
Japanese Zen Buddhists
American Zen Buddhists
American Buddhist monks
Deaths by drowning
Accidental deaths in Japan
20th-century Buddhist monks
People from Tochigi Prefecture